The 11th arrondissement of Paris (XIe arrondissement) is one of the 20 arrondissements of the capital city of France. In spoken French, this arrondissement is referred to as onzième.

The arrondissement, called Popincourt, is situated on the right bank of the River Seine. The arrondissement is one of the most densely populated urban districts of any European city.

Description
The eleventh arrondissement is a varied and engaging area. To the west lies the Place de la République, which is linked to the Place de la Bastille, in the east, by the sweeping, tree-lined Boulevard Richard-Lenoir, with its large markets and children's parks. The Place de la Bastille and the rue du Faubourg Saint-Antoine are full of fashionable cafés, restaurants, and nightlife, and they also contain a range of boutiques and galleries. The Oberkampf district to the north is another popular area for nightlife. The east is more residential, with more wholesale commerce, while the areas around the Boulevard Voltaire and the Avenue Parmentier are livelier crossroads for the local community. In recent years this district has emerged as one of the trendiest regions of Paris.

On November 13, 2015, it was the site of coordinated shootings and bombings that left 132 dead. About 20 years earlier, another attack had taken place.

Geography
The land area of this arrondissement is 3.666 km2 (1.415 sq. miles, or 906 acres).

Demography
The peak population of Paris's 11th arrondissement occurred in 1911, with 242,295 inhabitants. Today, the arrondissement remains the most densely populated in Paris, accompanied by a large volume of business activity: 149,102 inhabitants and 71,962 jobs in the last census, in 1999.

The population consists of a large number of single adults, though its eastern portions are more family-oriented. There is a strong community spirit in most areas of the eleventh, and it is interspersed with pleasant squares and parks.

Historical population

Immigration

Map

Places of interest

 Cirque d'hiver
 Sainte-Marguerite, Paris
 Église Saint-Ambroise
 ESCP-EAP
 Musée Édith Piaf
 Musée du Fumeur

Main streets and squares

Streets

 Rue Abel-Rabaud
 Rue Alexandre-Dumas
 Rue Amelot
 Rue Auguste-Laurent
 Rue Basfroi
 Boulevard Beaumarchais
 Boulevard de Belleville
 Cité Bertrand
 Passage Beslay
 Rue des Bluets
 Passage de la Bonne-Graine
 Rue des Boulets
 Avenue de Bouvines
 Rue de Candie
 Rue Chanzy
 Passage Charles-Dallery
 Rue Charles-Delescluze
 Boulevard de Charonne
 Rue de Charonne
 Rue du Chemin-Vert
 Rue du Chevet
 Rue Chevreul

 Rue de Crussol
 Rue Darboy
 Rue Daval
 Rue Deguerry
 Passage Dudouy
 Rue Faidherbe
 Rue du Faubourg-du-Temple
 Rue du Faubourg-Saint-Antoine
 Boulevard des Filles-du-Calvaire
 Rue de la Folie-Méricourt
 Rue de la Folie-Regnault
 Rue de la Fontaine-au-Roi
 Rue Froment
 Rue Godefroy-Cavaignac
 Rue Guillaume-Bertrand
 Rue des Immeubles-Industriels
 Rue Jacquard
 Rue Jean-Pierre-Timbaud
 Passage Josset
 Boulevard Jules-Ferry
 Rue Keller

 Rue de Lappe
 Rue La Vacquerie
 Avenue Ledru-Rollin
 Rue Léon-Frot
 Passage Lhomme
 Rue Louis-Bonnet
 Boulevard de Ménilmontant
 Rue Merlin
 Rue de Mont-Louis
 Rue de Montreuil
 Rue Morand
 Rue Moret
 Rue de Nemours
 Rue Neuve-Popincourt
 Rue Oberkampf
 Rue Omer-Talon
 Rue de l'Orillon
 Avenue Parmentier
 Rue du Pasteur-Wagner
 Rue Paul-Bert
 Avenue Philippe-Auguste

 Rue de la Pierre-Levée
 Rue Popincourt
 Rue Rampon
 Avenue de la République
 Boulevard Richard-Lenoir
 Rue de la Roquette
 Rue Saint-Ambroise
 Passage Saint-Antoine
 Rue Saint-Bernard
 Rue Saint-Maur
 Rue Saint-Sabin
 Rue Saint-Sébastien
 Rue Sedaine
 Rue Servan
 Boulevard du Temple
 Rue Ternaux
 Rue des Trois-Bornes
 Rue des Trois-Couronnes
 Avenue du Trône
 Rue Trousseau
 Boulevard Voltaire
 Rue de Belfort

Squares

 Place du 8 Février 1962
 Place des Antilles
 Place de la Bastille
 Place Léon-Blum
 Place de la Nation
 Place Pasdeloup
 Place de la République
 Square Bréguet-Sabin

 Square Colbert
 Square de la Folie-Régnault
 Square de la place Pasdeloup
 Square de la Roquette
 Square Denis-Poulot
 Square du Bataclan
 Square du docteur Antoine-Béclère
 Square Francis-Lemarque

 Square Godefroy-Cavaignac
 Square Jean-Aicard
 Square Jules-Ferry
 Square Louis-Majorelle
 Square Maurice-Gardette
 Square Mercœur
 Square Raoul-Nordling
 Square Saint-Ambroise

References

External links

Mairie du 11e website